Dorchester Town Football Club are a semi-professional football club, based in Dorchester, Dorset, England.

The club is affiliated to the Dorset County Football Association and is a FA chartered Standard club. They play at the Avenue Stadium, on land owned by the Duchy of Cornwall. They were founder members of the Conference South in 2004, which was the highest standard they have ever reached, but were relegated after ten years in 2014.

History
Founded in 1880, Dorchester Town were Dorset Senior Cup finalists in 1888 and 1890 before joining the Dorset League in 1896. Despite being founder members of the league, the club had little success before winning the championship in 1937/38 with a 2–0 victory at Sherborne on 25 April 1938.

The club joined the Western League in 1947, winning promotion from Division Two in 1950, and going on to take the league championship in 1954/55. The fifties proved to be a successful decade for the Magpies, winning the Dorset Senior Cup for the first time, and having a number of good runs in the FA Cup facing the likes of Norwich City, Queens Park Rangers, Port Vale and Plymouth Argyle. In 1954, Dorchester reached the 2nd Round before eventually losing out to York City in front of 5,500 fans at the old Avenue ground, in a season where York went on to reach the semi-finals.

Following four more victories in the Dorset Senior Cup, the club entered the Southern League (Division One South) in 1972. They first tasted success in this division when they finished runners-up to Margate in 1977/78, going unbeaten in the final 16 matches of the season, with manager David Best utilising his links with old club AFC Bournemouth to attract former first-teamers such as John O'Rourke, Jack Howarth and Harry Redknapp to the Avenue.

The formation of the Alliance League (now the Football Conference) unfortunately meant the Magpies ended up back in the reformed Southern Division a year later, but the club celebrated its centenary by winning the Southern Division in 1979/80 by a one-point margin over Aylesbury. Stuart Bell succeeded David Best as manager during the season, and the Magpies went unbeaten in the last 14 games to clinch the title. A young Trevor Senior impressed alongside ever-present top scorer Paul Thorne, whilst Graham Roberts joined neighbours Weymouth early in the campaign for £6,000 before going on to star for Tottenham Hotspur and England.

Senior stayed with Dorchester for a further two seasons, before signing for Portsmouth during the 1981/82 season for £35,000, going on to play for Watford, Middlesbrough and Reading, where he broke the Berkshire club's all-time goalscoring record. Before leaving the Magpies, Senior helped the club reach the 2nd Round of the FA Cup again before losing out to AFC Bournemouth in a replay at Dean Court in front of a crowd of 8,700. A goal four minutes from the end of extra time was enough to end Dorchester's dreams of a place in the third round – a feat they have still yet to achieve.

Relegated at the end of the 1983/84 season following a severe financial crisis, the club only just avoided dropping out of the league altogether the following year. However, a remarkable turnaround followed, and Dorchester returned to the Premier Division as champions at the end of the 1986/87 season, taking the title following a goalless draw at runners-up Ashford on the final day of the season.

The return to the top southern division has been a rollercoaster of emotions for Dorchester fans. Having been a mid-table team for a number of years, a brush with relegation came at the start of the nineties, and Stuart Morgan was introduced as manager in 1993. In his first full season, Morgan took the club to sixth in the league, followed by the sale of Darren Garner to Rotherham United for £30,000 during the summer.

The following seasons were a mixture of highs-and-lows, flirting with relegation on a number of occasions, facing Oxford United in the 1st Round of the FA Cup, reaching the last 16 of the FA Trophy for only the second time, and finishing fourth in the Premier Division in 1997/98.

Unfortunately in the following seasons, the Magpies were unable to rekindle the same form, and following a number of close-shaves at the wrong end of the table, the club were relegated to the Eastern Division at the end of the 2000/01 season, despite a strong FA Cup run culminating in a 3–1 First Round defeat at Wigan Athletic's 25,000 all-seater JJB Stadium.

Under the guidance of manager Mark Morris, Dorchester's young squad regained their Premier Division status within two years, defeating King's Lynn on the final day of the 2002/03 season to take the Eastern Division title ahead of Eastbourne Borough, having won 16 of their last 17 matches and scoring 114 goals in their 42 league games. A season earlier the Magpies had picked up the Southern League Cup for the first time, again defeating King's Lynn in a 4–0 aggregate victory in the final.

The first season back in the Premier Division was a difficult one but the club succeeded to reach the end-of-season play-offs, where two fine victories over Bath City and Tiverton Town saw Dorchester become a Conference club for the first time in the newly formed Conference South division. A season later the Magpies almost saw further play-off glory, but missed out on another promotion opportunity on the final day of the season, going down 7–3 at Bognor Regis Town.

A mid-table finish the following year ended with the resignation of Mark Morris – arguably the club's most successful manager in recent history – with Mick Jenkins taking charge of the first team. His reign, however, was short-lived. Despite the club's tenth success in the Dorset Senior Cup, the team narrowly avoided relegation by finishing 17th in the league, and Jenkins was sacked just a month later in the wake of Eddie Mitchell taking over the ownership of the club.

Mitchell's arrival at the helm saw former Dorchester midfielder Shaun Brooks installed as Director of Football, and the club announced it would be making the step up to full-time football ready for the 2007/08 season.

In September 2014, kitman Alex Legge, aged 38, died suddenly.

Community ownership

The club is democratically run by its supporters. The club has converted the pitch to 3g opening the start of the 2018/2019 season. The stadium now also hosts Yeovil Town W.F.C. home games, community football and youth training.

Colours and badge

The club have a long tradition of playing in black and white striped shirts with black shorts and socks at home. For the 2005–06 season, to celebrate the club's 125th anniversary the home club sported a black and white quartered shirt, similar to the original strip the club was founded in. The away kit is currently sky blue, with previous kits being red, yellow or white.

The club's current badge is circular, with the words 'Dorchester Town F.C.' and 'The Magpies' on a white outer rim, in black text. The central area contains two magpies on a brown branch in front of a sky blue background. Above them is a design based upon the town's Coat of arms, a purple circle containing a castle, upon which is a shield.

Stadium

Dorchester Town play their home games at the Avenue Stadium, Weymouth Avenue, Dorchester, Dorset, DT1 2RY.

The Avenue Stadiumis located near to a branch of Tesco on the outskirts of Dorchester.  Opened in 1990, it consists of one main stand, which is all-seated, and three small banks of terracing, which are all-standing. A railway line runs along the back of the stadium.
Whilst the capacity of the stadium is 5,229, Dorchester tend to attract crowds of around 500–600, although, during the 1990s, the club regularly achieved 900–1000 strong attendances.  The record attendance at the Avenue Stadium came in the 1999 season, in front of a crowd of 4,159. At the start of the 2011/12 season, a sponsorship deal was announced with Greene King IPA, with the stadium being rebranded 'The Greene King IPA Community Stadium'. A recent F.A. Cup game against Plymouth Argyle attracted 3,196 fans to the Avenue.  Dorchester beat their League neighbours 1–0 in a match which was televised live by ESPN in the UK and Fox Network in the USA.

==Players and Personnel==

First team

 
 

 
 

 (dual registration with Portland United)

Under 23s

Under 18s

===Club Personnel===

 Luke Richards Alan Attryde
 Cameron Dabbs

                                                                                  

|}

Honours
 Southern League Eastern Division
2003–04 Champions
 Southern League Southern Division
1979–80 & 1986–87 Champions
1977–78 Runners up
 Southern League Cup
2001–02 Winners
1991–92 Runners up
 Southern League Challenge Trophy
2002–03 Winners
 Western League Division One
1954–55 Champions
1960–61 Runners up
 Western Football League Professional Cup
1960–61 & 1961–62 Runners up
Western Football League Alan Young Cup:
 Winners (1): 1961–62
 Dorset Senior Cup
1950–51, 1960–61, 1967–68, 1968–69, 1971–72, 1993–94, 1995–96, 2000–01, 2002–03, 2006–07, 2010–11, 2011–12

Club records

Points in a season
Most – 93 in 42 games (2.21 points/game). (Southern League Division One East, 2002–03)
Least – 20 in 38 games (0.53 points/game). (Southern League Premier Division, 1983–84)

Wins in a season
Most – 28 in 42 games. (Southern League East, 2002–03)
Least – 4 in 38 games. (Southern League Premier Division, 1983–84)

Draws in a season
Most – 18 in 46 games. (Southern League South, 1981–82)
Least – 2 in 36 games. (Western League Division 1, 1958–59 and 1959–60)

Defeats in a season
Most – 27 in 40 games. (Southern League South, 1985–86)
Least – 5 in 42 games. (Southern League East, 2002–03)
The same number of drawn games occurred in the Western League Division Two, 1949–50, but the club played only 30 games.

Goals in a season
Most scored – 115 in 40 games (2.88 goals/games). (Western League Premier Division, 1960–61)
Most conceded – 96 in 34 games (2.82 goals/game). (Western League Second Division, 1948–49)
Least scored – 35 in 40 games (0.88 goals/game). (Southern League South, 1985–86)
Least conceded – 30 in 34 games (0.88 goals/game). (Southern League Division One South, 1976–77)

Notable former players

References

External links

 Official website

 
Association football clubs established in 1880
National League (English football) clubs
Fan-owned football clubs in England
Sport in Dorchester, Dorset
Southern Football League clubs
Football clubs in Dorset
1880 establishments in England
Football clubs in England